Ernest Pignon, known as Ernest Pignon-Ernest 1, is a French visual artist born February 23, 1942, in Nice. Intervening in the streets since 1966, he is considered one of the precursors2 of urban art in France. His drawings of Rimbaud and Pier Pasolini have become worldwide icons3. What Ernest Pignon-Ernest proposes is an ephemeral plastic intervention created purposely in correspondance to a chosen location in order to provoke resonances (symbolic, poetic, mythological, sacred, anthropological, political, event-based).

Biography
Family and youth
Ernest Pignon is the eldest of four. His father works in a slaughterhouse and his mother is a hairdresser. At home, there was no books, the familly culture was dominated by sports. He writes that he would have preferred shining at football, but that " early in childhood, drawing came to him as a gift".4 
At the age of twelve, the discovery of Picasso in an issue of Paris Match5 gives a new direction to his life. He becomes interested in painting, researches painters and begings with passion to acquire an artistic culture.
After obtaining his school leaving certificate in 1957 at the age of 15, he works for an architect6 , which allows him to continue drawing and to be financially independent. Living in Nice in a fertile environment of poets and artists, he develops an hyperactive personality, curious about the world, alert to social disorder and inequality.

Training
From 1959 onwards he rubbed shoulders with the young generation of artists and poets in Nice: Daniel Biga, Marcel Alocco, Marie-Claude Grail and Yvette Ollier, who is to become his partner. At Ben Vautier's Magasin, rue Tondutti de l'Escarène in Nice, he meets Arman, Claude Viallat, Martial Raysse, Le Clézio, Bernar Venet, Robert Filliou, Robert Malaval, Robert Bozzi, Noël Dolla... 
In 1960 André Riquier, a director, asks him to create the sets for Beckett's play "Fin de Partie". 
The following years, in 1961-1962, he is reluctantly called to join the army in Algeria and witnesses the cease-fire and the country's independence. Despite the circumstances, he continues to draw and brings back some works from Algeria, including a superb bull's head after Picasso, painted with walnut stain on newspaper.
On his return he resumes his work as a part-time architect7. In 1963, he heads to Toledo to see El Greco's paintings, which were to have a lasting influence on him. In Tuscany, he also discovers Masaccio, Duccio, Simone Martini and Fra Angelico.

Artistic career
In 1964, he rents a house on Mount Boron which will become a place of gathering and creation. In this house, the first edition of Daniel Biga's Oiseaux Mohicans is printed and the first issues of the magazine « Identités » are produced, as well as the « first Fourre-tout » by Ben.
With his partner Yvette Ollier, who directs and acts, he puts on several shows (Michaux, Dadelsen, Beckett, Nazim Hikmet, the Beat Generation).
His first paintings are inspired by Greco, Picasso, Bacon and current events. Following his stencil interventions on the Albion Plateau in 1966, he abandons the brushes to the benefit of drawings (in black and white) designed to echo specific places.
Thanks to the money he earns by designing a villa with a friend, he can focus for the first time on creation. He leaves Nice in 1965 and rents an abandoned café in Méthamis in the Vaucluse where he has a large studio4. He then takes on large formats (three metres by seven) with dark, expressionist canvases, influenced by the Greco/Picasso/Bacon trinity

His first exhibition takes place in 1969 at the Théâtre des Carmes in Avignon, where he presents four large format paintings and one hundred drawings. His practice of drawing and his activity in architectural offices lead him very early to the realization of sets and scenographies.

In 1973, he moves to La Ruche, the historic site of the École de Paris, where his neighbours include Arroyo, Chambas, Fanti, Maselli, Gruber, Raysse, Meurice, Alberola, etc. Following an article by Catherine Humblot8 in Le Monde, he is contacted by Marin Karmitz, who asks him to design the posters for a number of films. On this occasion, he meets Jean-Luc Godard, Marguerite Duras, Margarethe von Trotta, Ettore Scola, Vittorio Gassman...
During the 1970s, he tackles numerous social and political themes (apartheid, abortion, immigration, expulsions, work accidents) in France and abroad. His exhibition at the Musée d'Art Moderne de la Ville de Paris in 1979 reveals his work is not only about agitprop but also about a singular work of drawing and a reflection on urban space and its history. During this period, he produces film posters and drawings for Le Monde diplomatique, l'Humanité and Le Monde, but starting from this exhibition on, he is able to make a living from his art.
In 1987, an article by Henri-François Debailleux9 in the newspaper Libération of September 29 informs him that Francis Bacon is interested in his work. The following year, Bacon writtes to him: "My dear Ernest, I have always admired what you do, in particular the images of Grenoble, the photos of Naples that you so kindly sent me have interested me a lot ». (a film made by Alain Amiel in 2022 analyses their exchanges and evokes the common themes between the two works).

As dense and essential as his relationship with the city of Naples, his relationship with poetry and poets10 characterises Ernest Pignon-Ernest's work. For him, « poets are irreducible bearers of words, anger, revolt and utopia. They reveal to us the widest and sharpest reality ». He seizes the figures of poets (Mayakovsky, Neruda, Darwich, Pasolini, Rimbaud etc.) by combining their works, their destinies and their images to embody their country, their time, as well as the aspirations, contradictions and dramas that have gone through them and are still going through them11.
He is considered to be the pioneer12 of this urban art that will be called street-art. His work gains a large audience but is long boycotted by official institutions. His main exhibitions (Munich Pinacotheque, Venice Biennale, Beijing Palace of Fine Arts and his exhibitions in Belgrade, Geneva and Rome) are the result of foreign or private initiatives.
He lives and works in Paris and Ivry-sur-Seine where he has had his studio since 1973.

Awards and distinctions

• 1980: Grand Prize at the Alexandria Biennial7 for his work on the Alexandria Quartet by Lawrence Durrell 

• 1985: Vaillant-Couturier Prize7 

• 30 May 1996: Commander of the Order of Arts and Letters13 

• 2009: Simone and Cino del Duca Foundation Prize7,14 

• 2011 : Following Edmonde Charles-Roux, Ernest Pignon Ernest is elected president of the Friends of the newspaper L'Humanité 

• On November 24, 2021, he was elected a member of the Academy of Fine Arts, in the Painting section, in the chair of Vladimir Veličković15 .

References

External links
Official website
Attica

1942 births
Living people
French poster artists
Fluxus
Situationists
Members of the General Confederation of Labour (France)
Commandeurs of the Ordre des Arts et des Lettres